The Boeing CST-100 Starliner is a class of two partially reusable spacecraft designed to transport crew to the International Space Station (ISS) and other low-Earth-orbit destinations. It is manufactured by Boeing for its participation in NASA's Commercial Crew Program (CCP). The spacecraft consists of a reusable crew capsule and an expendable service module.

The Boeing Starliner holds a crew of up to seven people and is designed to be able to remain docked to ISS for up to seven months with reusability of up to ten missions. Starliner launches atop the Atlas V launch vehicle.

After several rounds of competitive development contracts within the Commercial Crew Program starting in 2010, NASA selected the Boeing Starliner, along with SpaceX Crew Dragon, for the Commercial Crew Transportation Capability (CCtCap) contract round. The first crewed test flight test was initially planned to occur in 2017.

In late 2019, the uncrewed Boeing Starliner Orbital Flight Test (Boe-OFT) launched on an Atlas V N22 and reached orbit, but the flight was not successful, failing to meet test objectives and returning to earth early. NASA allowed Boeing a repeat test flight, Boe-OFT 2, which was to launch in August 2021, but was scrubbed before launch due to inoperable valves in the propulsion system. After replacing the spacecraft's service module, Boeing targeted OFT-2 to occur in May 2022 at the earliest. OFT-2 ended up launching on May 19, 2022. The craft suffered several anomalies during its flight but controllers were able to work around them and Boeing and NASA expressed confidence in the spacecraft. The first crewed launch is scheduled for no earlier than April 2023.

Spacecraft characteristics 

Boeing's Starliner spacecraft is designed to accommodate seven passengers, or a mix of crew and cargo, for missions to low Earth orbit. For the NASA service missions to the ISS, it will carry four passengers and small cargo. Starliner uses a weldless structure and is reusable up to 10 times with a six-month turnaround time. Boeing plans to alternate between two reusable crew modules for all planned Starliner missions. Each flight uses a new service module, which provides propulsion and power-generation capacity for the spacecraft. It features wireless Internet and tablet technology for crew interfaces.

Starliner uses the NASA Docking System for docking. Boeing modified the design of the Starliner docking system prior to OFT-2, adding a hinged re-entry cover below the expendable nosecone for additional protection during the capsule's fiery descent through the atmosphere, similar to the one used in the SpaceX Dragon 2 nosecone. This was tested on the OFT-2 mission. This re-entry cover is hinged, like the SpaceX design. The capsule uses the Boeing Lightweight Ablator for its heat shield.

Solar cells, provided by Boeing subsidiary Spectrolab, are installed onto the aft face of the spacecraft's service module, and provide 2.9 kW of electricity. Also on the service module are four Rocketdyne RS-88 engines burning hypergolic propellants, which will be used for launch escape capability in the event of an abort. Starliner is designed to be compatible with multiple launch vehicles, including the Atlas V, Delta IV, and Falcon 9, as well as the in-development Vulcan Centaur.

In addition to the capsule and service module, a  structure is integrated into the launch vehicle adapter of Atlas V, called aeroskirt, to provide aerodynamic stability and dampen the shock waves that come from the front of the rocket.

History
Starliner was unveiled in 2010 as the CST-100, as Boeing's first commercially developed space capsule, where the company would take on the financial risk for development, rather than the US government under cost-plus contracting. The company stated that the capsule would draw upon Boeing's experience with NASA's Apollo, Space Shuttle and ISS programs as well as the Orbital Express project sponsored by the Department of Defense.  The new design was intended to be compatible with multiple launch vehicles, including the ULA Atlas V and Delta IV, and the SpaceX Falcon 9 at the time, In July 2010, Boeing stated that the capsule could be operational as early as 2015 with sufficient near-term approvals and funding.

In October 2011, NASA announced that the Orbiter Processing Facility-3 at Kennedy Space Center would be leased to Boeing for manufacture and test of Starliner, through a partnership with Space Florida.

On September 16, 2014, NASA chose Boeing (Starliner) and SpaceX (Crew Dragon) as the two companies to be funded to develop systems to transport U.S. government crews to and from the International Space Station. Boeing won a US$4.2 billion contract to complete and certify the Starliner by 2017, while SpaceX won a US$2.6 billion contract to complete and certify their crewed Dragon spacecraft. The contracts include at least one crewed flight test with at least one NASA astronaut aboard. Once the Starliner achieves NASA certification, the contract requires Boeing to conduct at least two, and as many as six, crewed missions to the space station. NASA's William H. Gerstenmaier had considered the Starliner proposal as stronger than the Crew Dragon and Sierra Nevada's Dream Chaser spacecraft.
, the capsule was to include one space tourist seat, and the Boeing contract with NASA would allow Boeing to price and sell passage to low-Earth orbit using that seat.

On September 4, 2015, Boeing announced that the spacecraft would officially be called the CST-100 Starliner, following the naming conventions of the 787 Dreamliner produced by Boeing Commercial Airplanes. In November 2015, NASA announced that it had dropped Boeing from consideration in the multibillion-dollar Commercial Resupply Services second-phase competition to fly cargo to the International Space Station.

In May 2016, Boeing delayed its first scheduled Starliner launch from 2017 to early 2018. Then in October 2016, Boeing delayed its program by six months, from early 2018 to late 2018, following supplier holdups and a production problem on the Spacecraft 2. By 2016, they were hoping to fly NASA astronauts to the ISS by December 2018.

In April 2018, NASA suggested that the first planned two-person flight of the Starliner, slated for November 2018, was now likely to occur in 2019 or 2020. If there are no further delays, it would be expected to carry one additional crew member and extra supplies. Instead of staying for two weeks, as originally planned, NASA said that the expanded crew could stay at the station for as long as six months as a normal rotational flight.

In November 2019, NASA's Office of Inspector General released a report revealing that a change to Boeing's contract had occurred, stating: "For Boeing’s third through sixth crewed missions, we found that NASA agreed to pay an additional $287.2 million above Boeing’s fixed prices to mitigate a perceived 18-month gap in ISS flights anticipated in 2019 and to ensure the contractor continued as a second commercial crew provider".

After the failure of its first uncrewed orbital test flight in late 2019, NASA agreed that Boeing would fund another uncrewed orbital test in August 2021. That launch was stopped late in the countdown due to valve problems. By late September 2021, Boeing had not determined the root cause of the problem, and the flight was delayed indefinitely. The first crewed test will be deferred until after this uncrewed test.

Funding 
Boeing funded development of Starliner in 2010 only after both commercial space station opportunities and NASA commercial crew contracts on offer allowed the business case to close. While the company had received $18 million under the NASA Commercial Crew Development (CCDev) contract by 2010 for early design work, substantial Boeing private funds would be required to complete development, even with Boeing competing for additional NASA contracts. This exposed Boeing to ordinary business financial risk that had not been a large part of traditional cost-plus contracting that Boeing had previously done for work on space capsules.

Boeing was awarded a US$92.3 million contract by NASA in April 2011 to continue to develop the CST-100 under CCDev phase 2. On August 3, 2012, NASA announced the award of US$460 million to Boeing to continue work on the CST-100 under the Commercial Crew Integrated Capability (CCiCap) program.

Due to delays and technical problems, Boeing has taken a number of charges against earnings for the Starliner program by 2022. This includes $410 million in 2020, $185 million in October 2021, and $288 million through the third quarter of 2022.

Launch profile
The Atlas V N22 (no fairing, two SRBs, and 2 Centaur engines) launches the Starliner. After passing through the stages of max q, SRB jettison, booster separation, Centaur ignition, nosecone and aeroskirt jettison, it finally releases the Starliner spacecraft at stage separation, nearly 15 minutes after lift-off on a  suborbital trajectory, just below the orbital velocity needed to enter a stable orbit around Earth. After separating from the Dual Engine Centaur, the Starliner's own thrusters, mounted on its service module, boost the spacecraft into orbit to begin its journey to the International Space Station.

The suborbital trajectory is unusual for a satellite launch, but it is similar to the technique used by the Space Shuttle and Space Launch System. It makes sure the upper stage of the rocket re-enters the atmosphere in a controlled way. The Starliner's orbit insertion burn begins about 31 minutes into the mission and lasts 45 seconds.

The N22 configuration is specific to Starliner. All other Atlas V payloads require fairings, but Starliner cannot use a fairing because it must be able to perform a "launch abort". In addition, all other Atlas V payloads use the single-engine version of the Centaur upper stage, but Starliner uses the two-engine version to provide more flexible abort options in the case of failures in the later phases of the launch. These changes increase crew safety. Starliner is the only crewed payload for Atlas V.

Development 

The CST-100 (Crew Space Transportation-100) name was first used when the capsule was revealed to the public by Bigelow Aerospace CEO Robert Bigelow in June 2010. The letters CST stand for Crew Space Transportation. The design draws upon Boeing's experience with NASA's Apollo, Space Shuttle and ISS programs, as well as the Orbital Express project sponsored by the Department of Defense. (Starliner has no Orion heritage, but it is sometimes confused with the earlier and similar Orion-derived Orion Lite proposal that Bigelow Aerospace was reportedly working on with technical assistance from Lockheed Martin.)

Receiving the full fixed-price payments for the Commercial Crew Program Phase 1 Space Act Agreement required a set of specific milestones to be met during 2010:
 Trade study and down-select between pusher-type and tractor-style launch escape system
 System definition review
 Abort system hardware demonstration test
 Base heat shield fabrication demonstration
 Avionics systems integration facility demonstration
 CM pressure shell fabrication demonstration
 Landing system demonstration (drop test and water uprighting test)
 Life-support air revitalization demonstration
 Autonomous rendezvous and docking (AR&D) hardware/software demonstration
 Crew module mockup demonstration.

Part of the agreement with NASA allows Boeing to sell seats for space tourists on CCP flights to the ISS. Boeing proposed including one seat per flight for a space-flight participant at a price that would be competitive with what Roscosmos charges tourists. Under the contract the Starliners are owned and operated by Boeing, not NASA, and Boeing is free to offer non-CCP commercial flights if they do not interfere with the contracted CCP flights.

Boeing designed the capsule to make airbag-cushioned landings on the ground rather than into water like earlier US space capsules, with five landing areas planned in the Western United States, enabling ≈450 landing opportunities each year.

The second uncrewed orbital test flight launched May 19, 2022.

Testing 

A variety of validation tests began on test articles in 2011 and continued on actual spacecraft starting in 2019.

In September 2011, Boeing announced the completion of a set of ground drop tests to validate the design of the airbag cushioning system. The airbags are located underneath the heat shield of the Starliner, which is designed to be separated from the capsule while under parachute descent at about  altitude. The airbags, manufactured by ILC Dover, are deployed by filling with a mixture of compressed nitrogen and oxygen gas, not with the pyro-explosive mixture sometimes used in automotive airbags. Bigelow Aerospace built the mobile test rig and conducted the tests.

In August 2013, Boeing announced that two NASA astronauts evaluated communications, ergonomics, and crew-interface aspects of the Starliner, showing how future astronauts will operate in the spacecraft as it transports them to the International Space Station and other low Earth orbit destinations.

Boeing reported in May 2016 that its test schedule would slip by eight months in order to reduce the mass of the spacecraft, address aerodynamics issues anticipated during launch and ascent on the Atlas V rocket, and meet new NASA-imposed software requirements. The Orbital Flight Test was scheduled for spring 2019. The booster for this Orbital Flight Test, an Atlas V N22 rocket, was assembled at United Launch Alliance's (ULA) facility at Decatur, Alabama by the end of 2017. The first crewed flight (Boe-CFT) was scheduled for summer 2019, pending test results from Boe-OFT. It was planned to last 14 days and carry one NASA astronaut and one Boeing test pilot to the ISS. On April 5, 2018, NASA announced that the first planned two-person flight, originally slated for November 2018, was likely to occur in 2019 or 2020. In July 2018, Boeing announced the assignment of former NASA astronaut Christopher Ferguson to the Boe-CFT mission. On August 3, 2018, NASA named its first Commercial Crew astronaut cadre of four veteran astronauts to work with SpaceX and Boeing: Robert Behnken, Eric Boe, Sunita Williams, and Douglas Hurley.

In July 2018, a test anomaly was reported in which there was a hypergolic propellant leak due to several faulty abort-system valves. Consequentially, the first unpiloted orbital mission was delayed to April 2019, and the first crew launch rescheduled to August 2019. In March 2019, Reuters reported that these test flights had been delayed by at least three months, and in April 2019 Boeing announced that the unpiloted orbital mission was scheduled for August 2019.

In May 2019, all major hot-fire testing, including simulations of low-altitude abort-thruster testing, was completed using a full up to service module test article that was "flight-like", meaning that the service module test rig used in the hot-fire testing included fuel and helium tanks, reaction control system, orbital maneuvering, and attitude-control thrusters, launch abort engines and all necessary fuel lines and avionics that will be used for crewed missions. This cleared the way for the pad abort test and the subsequent uncrewed and crewed flights.

A pad abort test took place on November 4, 2019. The capsule accelerated away from its pad, but then one of the three parachutes failed to deploy, and the capsule landed with only two parachutes. Landing was, however, deemed safe, and the test a success. Boeing did not expect the malfunction of one parachute to affect the Starliner development schedule.

First orbital flight test 

The uncrewed orbital flight test launched on December 20, 2019, but after deployment, an 11-hour offset in the mission clock of Starliner caused the spacecraft to compute that "it was in an orbital insertion burn", when it was not. This caused the attitude control thrusters to consume more fuel than planned, precluding a docking with the International Space Station. The spacecraft landed at White Sands Missile Range, New Mexico, two days after launch. After the successful landing, the spacecraft was named Calypso (after the research vessel  for the oceanographic researcher Jacques-Yves Cousteau) by the commander of the Boeing Starliner-1 mission, NASA astronaut Sunita Williams. The flight carried an Anthropomorphic Test Device (ATD) wearing Boeing's blue IVA spacesuit, named "Rosie the Rocketeer".

Two software errors detected during the test, one of which prevented a planned docking with the International Space Station, could each have led to the destruction of the spacecraft, had they not been caught and corrected in time, NASA said on February 7, 2020. A joint NASA–Boeing investigation team found that "the two critical software defects were not detected ahead of flight despite multiple safeguards", according to an agency statement. "Ground intervention prevented the loss of the vehicle in both cases". Before re-entry, engineers discovered the second critical software error that affected the thruster firings needed to safely jettison the Starliner's service module. The service module software error "incorrectly translated" the jettison thruster firing sequence.

With the completion of the NASA/Boeing investigation into the Starliner OFT-1 flight of December 2019, the review team identified 80 recommendations that Boeing, in collaboration with NASA, was addressing in 2020, when action plans for each were already well under way. Since the full list of these recommendations are company-sensitive and proprietary, only those changes publicly disclosed are known.

Second orbital flight test 

Software problems and other issues occurred during the first test flight, preventing the spacecraft from reaching the International Space Station. Boeing officials said on April 6, 2020 that the Starliner crew capsule would fly a second uncrewed demonstration mission, Orbital flight test 2, before flying astronauts. NASA said that it had accepted a recommendation from Boeing to fly a second unpiloted mission. The Washington Post reported that the second orbital flight test, with much the same objectives as the first, was expected to launch from Cape Canaveral "sometime in October or November 2020". Boeing said that it would fund the unplanned crew capsule test flight "at no cost to the taxpayer". Boeing told investors earlier in 2020 that it was taking a US$410 million charge against its earnings to cover the expected costs of a second unpiloted test flight. Boeing officials said on August 25, 2020 that they set the stage for the first Starliner demonstration mission with astronauts in mid-2021. Boeing modified the design of the Starliner docking system prior to OFT-2 to add a re-entry cover for additional protection during the capsule's fiery descent through the atmosphere. This re-entry cover is hinged, like the SpaceX design. Teams also installed the OFT-2 spacecraft's propellant heater, thermal-protection tiles, and the airbags used to cushion the capsule's landing. The crew module for the OFT-2 mission began acceptance testing in August 2020, which is designed to validate the spacecraft's systems before it is mated with its service module, according to NASA. On November 10, 2020, NASA's Commercial Crew Program manager Steve Stich said that the second orbital flight test would be delayed until first quarter 2021 due to software issues. The uncrewed test continued to slip, with the OFT-2 uncrewed test flight being scheduled for March 2021 and the crewed flight targeted for a launch the following summer. The launch date of OFT-2 moved again with the earliest estimated launch date set for August 2021.

During the August 2021 launch window some issues were detected with 13 propulsion-system valves in the spacecraft prior to launch. The spacecraft had already been mated to its launch rocket, United Launch Alliance's (ULA) Atlas V, and taken to the launchpad. Attempts to fix the problem while on the launchpad failed, and the rocket was returned to the ULA's VIF (Vertical Integration Facility). Attempts to fix the problem at the VIF also failed, and Boeing decided to return the spacecraft to the factory, thus cancelling the launch at that launch window. There was a commercial dispute between Boeing and Aerojet Rocketdyne over responsibility for fixing the problem. The valves had been corroded by intrusion of moisture, which interacted with the propellant, but the source of the moisture was not apparent. By late September 2021, Boeing had not determined the root cause of the problem, and the flight was delayed indefinitely.  NASA and Boeing continued to make progress and are "working toward launch opportunities in the first half of 2022",  In December 2021, Boeing decided to replace the entire service module and anticipated OFT-2 to occur in May 2022.

The OFT-2 mission launched on May 19, 2022. It again carried Rosie the Rocketeer test dummy suited in the blue Boeing inflight spacesuit. Two Orbital Maneuvering and Attitude Control System (OMACS) thrusters failed during the orbital insertion burn, but the spacecraft was able to compensate using the remaining OMACS thrusters with the addition of the Reaction Control System (RCS) thrusters. A couple of RCS thrusters used to maneuver Starliner also failed during docking due to low chamber pressure. Some thermal systems used to cool the spacecraft showed extra cold temperatures, requiring engineers to manage it during the docking.

On May 22, the capsule docked with the International Space Station. On May 25, the capsule returned from space and landed successfully. During reentry one of the navigation systems dropped communication with the GPS satellites, but Steve Stich, program manager for NASA's Commercial Crew Program, said this is not unexpected during reentry.

Crewed flight test

The last planned test flight is the crewed flight test. Although it had an original goal of 2017, various delays have pushed this back to no earlier than April 2023. The Crewed Flight Test will send a crew of two to the ISS for a short stay. This is the final test flight of Starliner, which will be cleared to begin operational flights after the results of this test are evaluated.

Commercial use 
On October 25, 2021, Blue Origin, Boeing, and Sierra Nevada Corporation's Sierra Space subsidiary for commercial space activities and space tourism released their plan for a commercial space station. The station, called Orbital Reef, is intended as a "mixed-use business park". Boeing was announced as a partner and Starliner, along with the Sierra Nevada Corporation's Dream Chaser, was chosen as one of the commercial spacecraft to transport commercial crew to and from the space station.

Launch vehicle availability
Starliner is compatible with Atlas V, Delta IV, Falcon 9, and Vulcan Centaur. Delta IV is retired and no longer available. ULA has announced that Atlas V is retiring and all remaining Atlas V launchers have been allocated to customers. , seven of these have been allocated to Starliner flights; enough for the crewed flight test and six operational missions. ULA plans to have Vulcan Centaur available in time for any additional flights.

List of spacecraft 
As of January 2020, Boeing planned to have three Boeing Starliner spacecraft in service to fulfill the needs of the Commercial Crew Program with each spacecraft expected to be capable of being reused up to ten times with a six-month refurbishment time. On August 25, 2020, Boeing announced its plan to alternate between just two capsules for all planned Starliner missions instead of three.

Since Boeing does not intend to build Spacecraft 4, no spare vehicle contingency exists for spacecraft issues (or loss) during NASA Commercial Crew contract.

List of flights 
List includes only completed or currently manifested missions. Launch dates are listed in UTC.

Technology partners 

 Aerojet Rocketdyne, for reaction control system (RCS) and retrorockets
 Airborne Systems, for parachutes
 Alliant Techsystems
 Bigelow Aerospace
 Samsung
 Spincraft
 ILC Dover, for airbags

See also 

 List of crewed spacecraft
 Orion (spacecraft)
 SpaceX Dragon 2, human-rated capsule-type spacecraft
 Dream Chaser, a human-rated spaceplane under development
 Orel, a human-rated spacecraft being developed in Russia
 Next-generation_crewed_spacecraft, a human-rated spacecraft being developed in China

Notes

References

External links 
  Starliner at Boeing.com
  by Boeing (2010)
  by Boeing (2014)
 Reporter’s Starliner Notebook
 Astronaut Doug Hines enters the Boeing Starliner for the first time during OFT-2

 
Bigelow Aerospace
Crewed spacecraft
Commercial spaceflight
Supply vehicles for the International Space Station
American spacecraft
Starliner
Reusable spacecraft